Vettuthura is a suburb of Thiruvananthapuram, the capital of Kerala, India. The main job in this area is fishing

Geography
It is located at Thiruvananthapuram, Kerala

Location
Nearest airport is Thiruvananthapuram International Airport and nearest major railway station is Thiruvananthapuram Central. Though the railway station at Kazhakkoottam (Kaniyapuram) is closer, only passenger trains halt there. It is well connected to Thiruvananthapuram city by state road transport buses.

References

External links
 About Vettuthura

Suburbs of Thiruvananthapuram